Thiago Nicolás Borbas Silva (born 7 April 2002) is a Uruguayan professional footballer who plays as a forward for Brazilian club Red Bull Bragantino.

Club career
Borbas started his youth career with Club Zorzal, after which he joined River Plate Montevideo. He made his professional debut for River Plate on 5 September 2020 in a 2–0 league win against Montevideo Wanderers. He scored his first goal on 10 October 2020 in a 2–1 win against Progreso.

On 30 November 2022, Brazilian club Red Bull Bragantino announced the signing of Borbas on a five-year deal until December 2027.

International career
Borbas is a former Uruguay youth international. On 21 October 2022, he was named in Uruguay's 55-man preliminary squad for the 2022 FIFA World Cup. However, he didn't make it to the final squad which was published three weeks later.

Career statistics

Honours
Individual
 Uruguayan Primera División Young Player of the Year: 2022
 Uruguayan Primera División Team of the Year: 2022
 Uruguayan Primera División top scorer: 2022

References

External links
 

2002 births
Living people
Footballers from Montevideo
Association football forwards
Uruguayan footballers
Uruguayan Primera División players
Club Atlético River Plate (Montevideo) players
Red Bull Bragantino players
Uruguayan expatriate footballers
Uruguayan expatriate sportspeople in Brazil
Expatriate footballers in Brazil